Stan Getz meets João & Astrud Gilberto: New York 1964 is a live recording of bossa nova in the making. In 1990, the Giants of Jazz label released a live recording of a 1964 New York City performance featuring Stan Getz, João Gilberto and Astrud Gilberto, his then-wife. The album, entitled Stan Getz meets João & Astrud Gilberto is actually misleading: the trio had met previously in 1963 for the recording of the wildly successful album Getz/Gilberto, which was released in 1964 and set off the bossa nova frenzy in the U.S. As a result of that album’s success, the Brazilian Gilbertos and the American Getz played a number of shows in the U.S., such as the one recorded here. Released as part of the “Immortal Concerts” series, this recording exhibits the chemistry the three obviously shared and captures bossa nova in its infancy, as it was still being created and defined.

Track listing  
 Corcovado (Quiet Nights)
 O Pato
 It Might as Well Be Spring
 Samba De Minha Terra
 One Note Samba
 Tonight I Shall Sleep with a Smile on My Face
 Bim Bom
 The Singing Song
 The Telephone Song
 Here's That Rainy Day
 Eu E Voce
 Rosa Moreno
 Grandfather's Waltz
 Only Trust Your Heart
 Um Abraco No Bonfa
 Stan's Blues
 Meditation
 Summertime
 Six-Nix-Pix-Flix

References

 

Live bossa nova albums
Stan Getz live albums
João Gilberto live albums
Astrud Gilberto albums
1964 live albums